The Shadow Line is the sixth studio album by the industrial rock band Godhead, released on August 29, 2006.

Background
In 2005, frontman Jason C. Miller invited James O'Connor to return as the band's drummer, which he accepted. Following the completion of The Shadow Line, however, O'Connor left the group for a second time.

"Trapped In Your Lies" was the album's lead single. It was followed by "Push" and "Hey You".

Track listing
"Trapped in Your Lies" - 3:30
"Hey You" - 4:12
"The Gift" - 4:33
"Fall Down" - 4:24
"Push" - 3:37
"Another Day" - 4:50
"Once Before" - 3:49
"Unrequitted" - 3:53
"Through the Cracks" - 4:20
"Goodbye" - 3:38
"Your End Of Days" - 4:26
"Inside Your World" - 3:49

References

2006 albums
Godhead (band) albums